The Italian Road Cycling Cup is a season-long road bicycle racing competition which consists of a number of standalone Italian races.

History
The competition was established in 2007 and is open to all riders who ride with an Italian-licensed team. The current format of the Italian Cycling Cup groups all Italian one-day and stages races of HC and first category, i.e. all races just below UCI World Tour level. Since 2016 the competition also includes the time trial and road race of the Italian national championships.

In each race, the top 20 riders score points and the rider scoring the most points in total is crowned the Italian Cycling Cup champion. Separate classifications are held for the best young rider and the best team. The winning team used to receive a wildcard invitation for the Giro d'Italia the following season.

Winners

See also

 Belgian Road Cycling Cup
 French Road Cycling Cup
 Premier Calendar

References

External links

Recurring sporting events established in 2007
Cycle racing in Italy
2007 establishments in Italy
Cycle racing series